The Morgan State Lady Bears basketball team represents Morgan State University, located in Baltimore, Maryland, in Division I basketball competition. They currently compete in the Mid-Eastern Athletic Conference. The Lady Bears play their home games at the Talmadge L. Hill Field House. Their head coach is Ed Davis Jr. who enters his 5th year in the position. 

The Lady Bears returned to Division I play and the MEAC in 1984, after an absence of 5 years. They have never won the MEAC Women's Basketball Tournament or have made a NCAA Division I women's basketball tournament appearance.

Postseason

Women's National Invitation Tournament 
The Lady Bears have made one appearance in the Women's National Invitation Tournament, with a record of 0–1.

AIAW College Division/Division II
The Lady Bears made two appearances in the AIAW National Division II basketball tournament, with a combined record of 2–2.

References

External links